is an antiphon and a responsory from the common of confessor bishops in the Liturgy of the Hours and in the Graduale Romanum, and the Epistle in their proper Mass. It belongs to Sir 50,1.

Contents
Its words are, which means "behold the great priest, who in his days, pleased God".

In certain cases, those words are followed by: , meaning "and has been found just".

In others, the response is:  (no one has been found to be like him in the keeping of the laws of the Most High)[Sir 44:20].

The following is a complete text and translation of a different version, which may be used at the procession of a bishop at a solemn celebration of ordination:

Behold a great priest who in his days pleased God:

Therefore by an oath the Lord made him to increase among his people.

To him He gave the blessing of all nations, and confirmed His covenant upon his head.

Therefore by an oath the Lord made him to increase among his people.

Glory to the Father and to the Son and to the Holy Spirit. . .

Meaning and Usage
The priest mentioned in the hymn refers to Christ, the high priest, in whose place the bishop stands.

It has been often set to music by composers, including Anton Bruckner, Edward Elgar and Jules Van Nuffel.

Christian liturgical music